Ivy Joyce Powell (25 May 1922 – 14 June 2003) was a New Zealand cricketer who played as a wicket-keeper and right-handed batter. She appeared in seven Test matches for New Zealand between 1954 and 1961. She played domestic cricket for Auckland.

References

External links
 
 

1922 births
2003 deaths
People from Matamata
New Zealand women cricketers
New Zealand women Test cricketers
Auckland Hearts cricketers
Cricketers from Waikato